The Laksar–Dehradun line is a railway route on the Northern Railway zone of Indian Railways. This route plays an important role in rail transportation of Garhwal division of Uttarakhand state.

History

 The first phase, from Laksar Junction to Jwalapur was opened on 1 January 1886.
 The third phase, from Haridwar to Dehradun was sanctioned on 18 November 1896 and opened on 1 March 1900.

Whereas, the branch line between Raiwala Junction and Rishikesh which were comes under the East Indian Railway Garhwal district portion was opened on 2 April 1927. And the extension of the line to Karnaprayag by Rishikesh–Karnaprayag line, the  railway station was inaugurated on 12 January 2021.

Electrification
The electrification was done on dividing the three sections of this route, the first section is Laksar Junction–Haridwar, the second section is Haridwar–Dehradun and the third section is Raiwala–Rishikesh branch. The First section is electrified on 28 September 2015. The second section is electrified on 20 October 2016. And the third section was opened on 2018.

Trains Passing through this line

Main
 Kathgodam–Dehradun Express
 Nanda Devi AC Express
 Mussoorie Express
 Dehradun–Amritsar Express
 Naini Doon Jan Shatabdi Express
 Dehradun Jan Shatabdi Express
 Dehradun Shatabdi Express
 Rapti Ganga Express
 Bandra Terminus–Dehradun Express
 Upasana Express
 Indore–Dehradun Express
 Ujjaini Express
 Uttaranchal Express
 Dehradun Banaras Express

Branch
 Kalinga Utkal Express
 Yoga Express
 Yog Nagari Rishikesh–Prayagraj Sangam Express
 Yog Nagari Rishikesh–Jammu Tawi Express
 Udaipur City–Yog Nagari Rishikesh Express
 Doon Express
 Kochuveli–Yog Nagari Rishikesh Superfast Express
 Hemkunt Express

References

5 ft 6 in gauge railways in India
Moradabad railway division
Rail transport in Uttarakhand
Transport in Dehradun